KROC may refer to:

 The ICAO code for Greater Rochester International Airport in Rochester, New York
 KROC (AM), a radio station (1340 AM) licensed to Rochester, Minnesota, United States
 KROC-FM, a radio station (106.9 FM) licensed to Rochester, Minnesota, United States
 KTTC, a television station (channel 10) licensed to Rochester, Minnesota, United States, which formerly used the call sign KROC-TV

See also
 KRoC, the Kent Retargetable Occam Compiler
 KROQ-FM, radio station in Greater Los Angeles, California, USA